Cyril Anthony Kinsey (born 11 October 1927) is an English jazz drummer and composer.

Early life
Kinsey was born in Sutton Coldfield, Birmingham, England.  He held jobs on trans-Atlantic ships while young, studying while at port with Bill West in New York City and with local musician Tommy Webster in Birmingham. He had a close association with Ronnie Ball early in his life; the two even had a double wedding together.

Career
Kinsey led his own ensemble at the Flamingo Club in London through the 1950s, and recorded on more than 80 sessions between 1950 and 1977, including with Tubby Hayes, Bill Le Sage, Ronnie Scott, Johnny Dankworth, Tommy Whittle, Joe Harriott, Lena Horne, Frank Holder, Ella Fitzgerald, Ben Webster, Clark Terry, Harry Edison, Buddy DeFranco, Billie Holiday, Oscar Peterson, and Sarah Vaughan. He performed at European jazz festivals both as a drummer and as a poet. He did some work as a session musician in the 1950s and 1960s, playing on records by Eddie Calvert, Cliff Richard, and Ronnie Aldrich.  Kinsey was also a founder member of the group, 'The John Dankworth Seven' in 1950.

He was a resident at the Florida Club, Leicester Square, in the 1950s and had his own trio from 1963 to 1965.  In the mid 1980s he performed regularly with jazz vibraphone player Lennie Best at venues in the London area including the South Hill Park Cellar Bar in Bracknell.
  
Kinsey also branched into composition; a string quartet composition of his is used in the short film On the Bridge, and he wrote arrangements for big bands in addition to music for over 100 commercials. His Quintet for string quartet and harmonica Reflections, has been recorded by Gianluca Littera and the Quartetto Energie Nove. Later in his life he wrote music for a musical based on the life of George Eliot.  He continues to play drums.

In 2012, Kinsey appeared in the documentary film, No One But Me, discussing jazz musician, Annie Ross.

References

External links
 
[ Tony Kinsey] at Allmusic

1927 births
Living people
English jazz drummers
British male drummers
English composers
British male jazz musicians